Diuris oporina, commonly called the autumn donkey orchid or northern white donkeys tails is a species of orchid that is endemic to Queensland. It has a single tapering, linear leaf at its base and up to ten white flowers with mauve to purple markings. It grows in the drier parts of the tablelands in Far North Queensland.

Description
Flowering occurs mainly from March to May, sometimes later.

Taxonomy and naming
Diuris oporina was first formally described in 1991 by David Jones from a specimen collected near Watsonville, Queensland on the Atherton Tableland and the description was published in Australian Orchid Research. The specific epithet (oporina) is derived from the Ancient Greek word oporinos meaning "autumnal", referring to the flowering period of this species.

Distribution and habitat
The autumn donkey orchid grows on ridges and sloped in forest and woodland on the drier parts of the Atherton and Evelyn tablelands.

References

oporina
Endemic orchids of Australia
Orchids of Queensland
Plants described in 1991